Xu Shiyou (1906–1985) was a general in the Chinese People's Liberation Army.

Early career
Born in Xinxian, Henan Province (it belonged to Hubei previously), Xu grew up studying martial arts at the Shaolin Temple for eight years and he later became a soldier in Wu Peifu's warlord army. After having served as a lieutenant in the Kuomintang army, he joined the Chinese Communist Party in 1927.

Xu first emerged in the annals of Chinese military history in Hubei in 1927, as part of a nascent military unit that included future generals Qin Jiwei and Chen Zaidao. In 1932, he commanded the 34th Regiment, 12th Division of the Fourth Front Army led by future Marshall Xu Xiangqian. His deputy in the 25th Division, 9th Corps (which Xu later led) in 1933–36, Chen Xilian, later rose to serve on the Politburo Standing Committee during the Great Proletarian Cultural Revolution. By the age of 29, Xu Shiyou commanded the Red 9th Corps of the Fourth Front Army.

Eight months after the First Front Army abandoned the Jiangxi Soviet and embarked on the Long March, it met up with Zhang Guotao’s Fourth Front Army, in June 1935 at Maogong, Sichuan. Zhang favored consolidating power in Sichuan whereas Mao Zedong wanted to continue on to Gansu and Ningxia, to receive aid from the Soviet Union. The compromise decision was to convene a conference, in July at Mao’ergai. Despite support from Liu Bocheng, Zhu De and other commanders, Mao would not be convinced. As a result, the Fourth Front Army was divided into a Left Column under Liu, Zhu and Zhang; and a Right Column under Xu Xiangqian. Xu Shiyou at the time commanded a cavalry regiment.

The Second Front Army, under He Long and Ren Bishi, and Xiao Ke's Sixth Front Army linked up with the Fourth Front Army in June 1936. Again dividing their forces, He Long took the Second on a northward line toward Gansu while Zhang led his forces somewhat west of that line. The result was that Zhang's Fourth Front Army was battered by Nationalist and warlord troops, and arrived in Yenan in poor shape in October 1936. Zhang was forced to submit to Mao's leadership.

In the first half of 1937, just prior to the formal beginning of the Sino-Japanese War, the purge of Zhang Guotao and his closest officers sparked turmoil within the party. Cadets of the Fourth Front Army studying at the Counter-Japanese Military and Political University (Kang Da), including Xu, confronted the party leadership over accusations that Zhang was disloyal.

In 1939, Xu Xiangqian led elements of the 129th Division – including Xu Shiyou and Han Xianchu – into western Shandong to recruit new soldiers. Xu Shiyou went on to serve as deputy commander of the 385th Brigade, 129th Division in eastern Shandong and expanded his forces into the 11th Army of Marshall Chen Yi’s Third Field Army. One of his key deputies during the war was Nie Fengzhi, who would later command the Chinese People's Volunteers Air Force during the Korean War. Xu remained in Shandong until 1954. In the fall of 1947, Xu commanded the East Front Army Corps of Chen Yi's East China Field Army (later the 3rd Field Army); his political commissar, Tan Zhenlin, was one of the most powerful figures in East China. They took Jinan in September 1948.

Regional power
At the end of the war, Xu's forces found themselves in Shanghai, and he became a member of the East China Military and Administrative Committee under Chen Yi and Su Yu. As the Korean War unfolded, he moved into Shandong (assuming a seat on the local governing committee and the post of Military District Commander), to confront what was thought to be the risk of an American landing on Chinese soil. In Shandong, he worked closely with Gu Mu and Kang Sheng. In 1959, his 12th and 60th Corps returned from Korea to the Nanjing Military Region where they provided the power base he would enjoy well into the 1970s.

Xu served as Commander of the Nanjing Military Region (1954–74), first under East China Military and Administrative Committee chairman Rao Shushi, and then for ten years with Gang of Four member Zhang Chunqiao as his political commissar (1967–76). This assignment was the single longest tenure of any Military Region commander on record. Among his deputies during the 1960s were future regional leaders Sung Shilun, Wang Bicheng and Tan Qilong, As the armed forces were called in to restore administrative control, he became Chairman of the Jiangsu Province Revolutionary Committee (1968–74) and CCP First Secretary (1970–74). In the long-delayed military region reshuffle initiated under Deng Xiaoping, Xu was rotated to command the Guangzhou MR (1974–80). Xu and political commissar Wei Guoqing provided protection for Deng Xiaoping in 1976, when the future paramount leader was purged by the Gang of Four following the death of Zhou Enlai. Xu was also commander in chief for the Chinese forces in the Sino-Vietnamese War in 1979.

Central power
After being elected an Alternate Member of the 8th Central Committee in 1956, Xu Shiyou served in the Politburo of the 9th, 10th and 11th CCP Central Committees (1969–82). He was a Vice Minister of National Defense (1959–70) and a member of the National Defense Council (1965–75). From 1980, he was also a member of the Military Affairs Commission. In September 1982, Xu became the only military officer named a founding Vice Chairmen of the Central Advisory Commission.

Personal life and important events

Xu Shiyou married three times. His first wife was a traditional rural woman. The second wife, Li Mingzhen, was married to him in the E-Yu-Wan border region. His third and the last wife, Tian Pu, was married to him in Shandong during the Second Sino-Japanese War (1937–1945). Both Li Mingzhen and Tian Pu are members of the People's Liberation Army. Tian died on June 30, 2017.

In September 1926, Xu joined the Chinese Communist Youth League and go to Wuhan to participate in the National Revolutionary Army.  Division 1 Group.
In August 1927, he joined the Red Army, served for Red Mountain Area 31 Division 2 team squad. 
In November 1927, he was the platoon leader of Red Army 31 Division 4 Team 5 platoon.
In 1929, he was appointed a battalion regiment commander of 31 Division 1.
In April 1930, he served for Red Army regiment 12, division 34.
In July 1933, he was appointed Deputy Army and Chairman of Red 9 Jun 25 Division. Red Army commander, he Participated in the Long March.
In November 1936, he studied in Red Army college when they reached northern Shaanxi.
In 1938, he was Deputy Minister of Administrative Affairs. Anti-Japanese Military and Political University  
In June 1939, he was the Deputy Brigade Commander of 129 Brigade Division 386 of The Eighth Route Army 
In October 1939, he was in the Northern Bureau of the CCP Central Committee.
In September 1940, column of the Eighth Route Army 3rd Brigade of Shandong.
In February 1942, he was the Chief of Staff of Shandong column.
In 1942, he was appointed member of Shandong, Shandong Military Region Commander of the Regional party committee.
During the Liberation War, he served as regional party committee members Shandong, Shandong Military Region Commander.
In 1947, he was the Commander of the 9th column, East Field Army Corps, Shandong Corps Commander and was on Party Committee.
In March 1949, he was a member of Shandong Military Region Deputy Commander. 
After the founding of the PRC, he was the Military Region Deputy Commander of Shandong branch of the CCP Central Committee.
From December 1949 to 1953, he was on the Huadong Military Committee.
From January 1950 to 1951, he was on CCP Central Committee, Shandong Branch Commission for Discipline Inspection.
From April 1950 to 1953, he was Shandong Military Region Commander.
From December 1952 to 1954, he was the deputy secretary of Shandong branch, CCP Central Committee.
From April 1953 to 1954, he served as commander of No. 3 in the Chinese People's Volunteers Corps.
From July 1953 to 1954, he was on the East CCP Central Committee Board.
From February 1954 to 1955, he was deputy commander of Military Region 2, No. 3 Military Party Committee secretary, Huadong region.
From October 1954 to 1959, he was appointed Deputy Chief of Staff of the PLA.
From March 1955 to 1973, he was appointed commander of Military Region 3 party secretary, party secretary of Nanjing Military Region.
From October 1958 to 1960, he was on Shanghai Bureau of the CCP Central Committee .
From September 1959 to 1978, he was appointed deputy defense minister.
From February 1961 to 1966, he was secretary of the CCP Central Committee East China Bureau.
From March 1968 to 1973, he was appointed director of Jiangsu Provincial Revolutionary Committee.
From March 1970, he was appointed Provincial Revolutionary Committee of the party's core team leader.
From December 1970 to 1973 he was on CCP Jiangsu Provincial Committee.
From April 1969 to 1982, he was the member of the CCP Central Military Commission the CCP Central Committee Political Bureau.
From January 1980 to 1982 He served as a member of the Standing Committee of CCP Central Military Commission.
From December 1973 to 1980, he was Guangzhou Military Region Commander, Military District No. 1 party secretary (April 1974 onwards).
From September 1982 to 1985 CCP Central Committee, he was the deputy director of Advisory Committee Standing Committee. Session 1-3 Defense Committee. No. 1,4,5 th National People's Congress. The 8th CCP Central Committee alternate members, (12) members, 9-11th Central Committee Political Bureau, member of the Central Advisory Board of 12 Elected member of the Standing Committee and deputy director.
In September 1955, he was awarded the rank of general, an honor Medal, an Order of Independence and Freedom Medal, a Liberation Medal.
On October 22, 1985, he died in Nanjing.

References 

1906 births
1985 deaths
People's Liberation Army generals from Henan
Politicians from Xinyang
Governors of Guangdong
People's Republic of China politicians from Henan
Chinese Communist Party politicians from Henan
Political office-holders in Jiangsu
Commanders of the Guangzhou Military Region
Members of the 11th Politburo of the Chinese Communist Party
Members of the 10th Politburo of the Chinese Communist Party
Members of the 9th Politburo of the Chinese Communist Party
Disciples of Shaolin Temple
Deputy Ministers of National Defense of the People's Republic of China
Deaths from cancer in the People's Republic of China
Deaths from liver cancer